The Europe/Africa Zone was one of three zones of regional Federation Cup qualifying competition in 1992. All ties were played at the Olympic T.C. in Athens, Greece on clay courts.

The sixteen teams were divided into four pools of four to compete in round-robin matches. After each of the ties had been played, the teams that finished first and second in each of the respective pools would then move on to the three-round knockout stage of the competition. The team that won the knockout stage would go on to advance to the World Group.

Pool Stage
Date: 13–15 April

Knockout stage

  advanced to the World Group.

References

 Fed Cup Profile, South Africa
 Fed Cup Profile, Ireland
 Fed Cup Profile, Estonia
 Fed Cup Profile, Croatia
 Fed Cup Profile, Greece
 Fed Cup Profile, Portugal
 Fed Cup Profile, Slovenia
 Fed Cup Profile, Norway
 Fed Cup Profile, Lithuania
 Fed Cup Profile, Latvia
 Fed Cup Profile, Yugoslavia
 Fed Cup Profile, Malta

See also
Fed Cup structure

 
Europe Africa
Sports competitions in Athens
Tennis tournaments in Greece
1992 in Greek sport